The .458 Winchester Magnum is a belted, straight-taper cased, big five game rifle cartridge. It was introduced commercially in 1956 by Winchester and first chambered in the Winchester Model 70 African rifle. It was designed to compete against the .450 Nitro Express and the .470 Nitro Express cartridges used in big bore British double rifles.  The .458 Winchester Magnum remains one of the most popular large game cartridges, and most major ammunition manufacturers offer a selection of .458 ammunition.

History 

The .458 Winchester Magnum was designed for hunting dangerous game animals by emulating the performance of powerful English double rifle cartridges in a bolt-action rifle.  The use of a bolt-action rifle offered hunters a cheaper alternative to the big-bore double rifle, and ammunition could be manufactured using available tooling. The .458 Winchester Magnum soon became a success as dangerous game hunters adopted the cartridge. Soon game wardens, wildlife managers, and professional hunters switched to the .458 Winchester Magnum as their duty rifle. The cartridge would become the standard African dangerous game cartridge in short order.

By 1970 issues with the cartridge began to surface. Winchester had been using compressed loads of ball powder as a propellant for .458 Winchester Magnum. Due to clumping of the powder charge and the erratic burn characteristics associated with such loads, performance of the cartridge came into question. While Winchester addressed this issue, the stigma remained, and the cartridge's performance on dangerous game was suspect. However, the .458 Winchester Magnum remained the standard of measure for dangerous game cartridges.

Recently, other .458 cartridges and various .416 cartridges have gained wider acceptance, but the 458 Win Mag remains one of the popular choices.

Specifications
The .458 Winchester Magnum was designed from the outset to duplicate the performance level of the .450 Nitro Express and the .470 Nitro Express, which had become the mainstay of African dangerous game hunters. The .450 Nitro Express had been rated to launch a  bullet at  out of a  barrel while the .470 Nitro Express would launch a  bullet at  out of a  barrel. The design criteria for the .458 Winchester Magnum called for it to launch a  bullet at  out of a  barrel.

SAAMI compliant .458 Winchester Magnum cartridge schematic: All dimensions in inches [millimeters].

The cartridge remains the largest of the standard length magnum cartridge family released by Winchester, which includes the somewhat obsolete .264 Winchester Magnum and the popular .338 Winchester Magnum.

While case volume varies between manufacturers, the typical Winchester case capacity is 95 grain of H2O (6.17 cm3).

Performance
The original specifications for the cartridge called for a  bullet to be fired at a velocity of  through a  barrel. Winchester achieved and surpassed this performance with their .458 Magnum cartridge.

Current performance standards for the cartridge allow it to launch a   bullet at a velocity of about  through a  barrel. The  bullet is seen as the standard weight for a 45 caliber (11.43 mm) rifle bullet. This bullet has a sectional density of .341, which provides the bullet a high penetrative value at a given velocity. Among standard sporting cartridge bullets, the 45 caliber (11.43 mm)  bullet has the highest sectional density. While bullets such as the  30 caliber (7.62 mm) bullet with a sectional density of .374 and even a  45 caliber (11.43 mm) with a sectional density of .409 exist these weights are not seen as a standard for those calibers. The .458 Winchester Magnum loaded with the  solid bullet provides adequate penetration for dangerous game up to and including elephant.

Due to the cartridge's relatively short case and powder column, longer bullets and those with a lower weight to length ratio—such as mono-metal bullets like the A-Square Monolithic Solid and the Barnes Banded Solids—may take up valuable powder space and lead to lower velocities and reduced performance. Bullets that tend to have a high weight to length ratios such as now discontinued  Speer African Grand Slam solid tend to work better in the .458 Winchester Magnum.

However, as no mainline ammunition manufacturer provides sub- .458 Winchester ammunition this is a choice for those who load their own ammunition or have access to custom-loaded ammunition.

Sporting usage
The .458 Winchester Magnum was designed for use against heavy thick skinned African game species such as elephant, rhinoceros and African Cape buffalo. The exceptional sectional density of the  bullet combined with a muzzle velocity of between  provides the cartridge adequate penetration on these dangerous game species. Rifles produced for this cartridge usually weighed under . The combination of these factors helped the .458 Winchester Magnum become the most popular dangerous game cartridge on the African continent.

Unlike the more powerful .460 Weatherby Magnum the .458 Winchester Magnum is not considered overly powerful for the larger felids such as lion or leopard in Africa. However, bullet selection is important for these felids as they are not considered thick skinned species with the largest of the lions weighing under . These species require bullets that open quickly upon impact, such as A-Square's Lion load.

While the .458 Winchester Magnum is considered over powered for North American game species, the cartridge has found use for the hunting of large bears such as the polar and Alaskan brown bear and American bison. A few guides in Alaska and Canada carry rifles chambered in this cartridge to provide a defense against these largest bear species for themselves and their clients. The number one cartridge of professional guides in Alaska for Great Bears is the .338 Winchester Magnum.

Ammunition

Since the .458 Winchester Magnum was intended as a dangerous game hunting cartridge, almost all ammunition manufactured for the cartridge is manufactured for these game species.

Winchester currently offers ammunition in the traditional  Soft Point and the new  Nosler Partition and Nosler Solid.

Hornady offers what they call a "heavy magnum" loading that features a  bullet with a velocity of approx . They use a special double-based cooler burning propellant ("powder") not available to the public for handloading. This innovative loading allows the .458 Winchester Magnum to attain  of muzzle energy. Numerous companies offer rifles in this caliber, including the Winchester Model 70, which was used by Clint Eastwood in Dirty Harry.

The rounds for the .458 Win mag are more expensive than cartridges like the popular .30-06, making handloading a worthwhile effort. Though more expensive than deer hunting ammunition, the .458 Winchester Magnum is significantly less expensive than its competitors. For many decades the .458 has been the most popular rifle cartridge of professional hunters who pursue heavy dangerous game in Africa because of its performance, price, and availability. When British ammunition companies, including Kynoch, began closing in the 1960s, Winchester and the .458 Winchester Magnum filled the gap left behind.

The recoil of the factory loads is about 70 foot pounds. This load mimics the .45/70 in both power and recoil.

{| class="wikitable" border="1"
|+ .458 Winchester Magnum Ammunition  
|-
| style="background: #eeeeee" width="180pt" | Ammunition  
| style="background: #eeeeee" width="210pt" | Bullet 
| style="background: #eeeeee" width="140pt" | Muzzle Velocity 
| style="background: #eeeeee" width="140pt" | Muzzle Energy 
| style="background: #eeeeee" width="200pt" | MPBR/Zero 
| style="background: #eeeeee" width="180pt" | Notes
|-
| style="background: #eeeeee" | Winchester X4581 || Winchester  SP ||  ||  || / || Currently in production
|-
| style="background: #eeeeee" | Winchester S458WSLSP || Nosler  Partition ||  ||  || / || Currently in production
|-
| style="background: #eeeeee" | Winchester S458WSLS || Nosler  Solid ||  ||  || / || Currently in production
|-
| style="background: #eeeeee" | Federal P458T1 || TBBC  SP ||  ||  || / || Currently in production
|-
| style="background: #eeeeee" | Federal P458T2 || TBBC  SP ||  ||  || / || Currently in production
|-
| style="background: #eeeeee" | Federal P458T3 || TBSS  Solid ||  ||  || / || Currently in production
|-
| style="background: #eeeeee" | Federal P458D || Barnes  TSX ||  ||  || / || Currently in production
|-
| style="background: #eeeeee" | Federal P458E || Barnes  BS ||  ||  || / || Currently in production
|-
| style="background: #eeeeee" | Federal P458SA || Swift  A Frame ||  ||  || / || Currently in production
|-
| style="background: #eeeeee" | Norma 20111102 || Barnes  BS ||  ||  || / || Currently in production
|-
| style="background: #eeeeee" | Norma 20111202 || Swift  A Frame ||  ||  || / || Currently in production
|-
|colspan="6" align="left" | Values courtesy of the respective manufacturer. MPBR/Zero values courtesy of Big Game Info. Temperature:  Altitude: † Discontinued    
|}

Criticism
The .458 Winchester Magnum has had critics in its over 50 years of existence. By the late 1960s, professional hunters such as Jack Lott and others, suspected performance issues with .458 Winchester Magnum ammunition, particularly as produced by Winchester.

Winchester loaded the cartridges with a ball powder that required compression to fit enough in the .458 short case to provide required performance. In time, however, the compressed powder charge "caked," causing erratic burn and poor performance levels. By the 1970s, Winchester rectified this issue by manufacturing the cartridge with non-clumping propellant.

While the design specifications had called for a  bullet at  through a  barrel, hunters wanting a lighter, handier faster swinging rifle were gravitating towards rifles sporting shorter barrels. Shorter barrels, as expected, produced reduced performance levels due to lower attainable velocities. However, the .458 Winchester Magnum cartridge was blamed for the loss of performance, and Winchester was accused of over-stating the cartridge's performance.

Due to the negative publicity, Winchester increased the performance of the .458 Winchester Magnum, which allowed the  bullet to achieve . While Winchester, like most .458 Winchester Magnum ammunition manufacturers (except Norma), continues to state velocities achieved from the  test barrel, the velocity from a  barrel is in keeping with the original expectations of the cartridge.

See also
 11 mm caliber
 .458×2-inch American
 .450 Marlin
 .458 Lott
 .458 SOCOM
 .50 Beowulf
 List of rifle cartridges
 Table of handgun and rifle cartridges

References

Pistol and rifle cartridges
Winchester Magnum rifle cartridges